Muhammad V an-Nasir, commonly known Naceur Bey (La Marsa, 14 July 1855 – La Marsa, 8 July 1922) was the son of Muhammad II ibn al-Husayn and the fifteenth Husainid Bey of Tunis, ruling from 1906 until his death. He was named Divisional General of the Beylical army when he became Bey al-Mahalla (Heir Apparent) on 11 June 1902, and assumed the rank of Marshal when he succeeded Muhammad IV al-Hadi on 11 May 1906.

The reign of Naceur Bey saw increasing tension between the authorities of the French Protectorate and the Tunisian population.  Shortly before he succeeded as Bey, the Thala-Kasserine Disturbances broke out and a few years later the discontent escalated to include major incidents such as the Jellaz Affair and the Tunis Tram Boycott.  The French managed to secure from him a decree expelling the leaders of the Tunisian national movement, Ali Bach Hamba, Hassan Guelati, Mohamed Nomane and Abdelaziz Thâalbi from the country in March 1912.

Increasingly dissatisfied with the way the authorities were treating the Destour, in April 1922 he threatened to abdicate if France did not meet their demands, including the repeal of French laws on naturalisation. In response, the French Resident General Lucien Saint surrounded the Bey's palace with troops in order to put pressure on him not to do so. With his hand forced, he complied with the wishes of the French. Humiliated by this experience, he died on 8 July.

He was buried in the mausoleum of Tourbet el Bey in the medina of Tunis. He was succeeded by his cousin Muhammad VI al-Habib and his oldest son, Moncef Bey became Bey in 1942.

See also
History of French-era Tunisia

Notes

1855 births
1922 deaths
Beys of Tunis
Knights Grand Cross of the Order of St Michael and St George
Tunisian royalty